Phintella caledoniensis is a species of jumping spider in the genus Phintella that lives in New Caledonia. First described in 2009 by Barbara Patoleta, it was named after the island where it was found.  The spider is small and has a brown cephalothorax with patches, the female being generally darker, and a grey or grey-brown abdomen. The female has distinctive bean-shaped spermatheca and the male a long and thin embolus.

Taxonomy
Phintella lajuma was first identified in 2009 by Barbara Patoleta. The species is named after the island where it was first found. The genus Phintella was raised in 1906 by Embrik Strand and W. Bösenberg. The genus name derives from the genus Phintia, which it resembles. The genus Phintia was itself renamed Phintodes, which was subsequently absorbed into Tylogonus. There are similarities between spiders within genus Phintella and those in Chira, Chrysilla, Euophrys, Icius, Jotus and Telamonia. Genetic analysis confirms that it is related to the genera Helvetia and Menemerus and is classified in the tribe Chrysillini.

Description
The spider is medium-sized, with shape that is typical of the genus, with a broad cephalothorax with flat sides that is wider than the abdomen. It is most similar to Phintella volupe, found in Sri Lanka, but can be distinguished by its copulatory organs. The female of the species has a dark brown cephalothorax, with white patches. It has a grey oval abdomen and spinnerets that are also grey. The clypeus and chelicerae are brown. The female has a distinctive bean-shaped spermathecae.

The male is slightly lighter in colour and larger than the female, and the male's abdomen and spinnerets are grey-brown. The pedipalps are light brown and the embolus is long and thin.

Distribution and habitat
Phintella caledonia has only been discovered in the rainforest around Mont Panié on New Caldonia.

References

Citations

Bibliography

Spiders of New Caledonia
Salticidae
Spiders described in 2009